Chrysaethe aurantipennis is a species of beetle in the family Cerambycidae. It was described by Giesbert in 1991.

References

aurantipennis
Beetles described in 1991